Rigoberto Beltrán (born November 13, 1969) is a Mexican former professional baseball left-handed pitcher. He played internationally for the Mexico national team, and is currently the bullpen coach for the Cleveland Guardians of Major League Baseball (MLB).

Career
A native of Tijuana, Mexico, Beltrán attended Point Loma High School in San Diego, and is an alumnus of the University of Wyoming. In 1989 and 1990, he played collegiate summer baseball with the Brewster Whitecaps of the Cape Cod Baseball League.

Drafted by the St. Louis Cardinals in the 26th round of the 1991 Major League Baseball Draft, Beltrán would make his Major League Baseball debut with the Cardinals on June 2, . He pitched for Mexico at the 2003 Pan American Games, winning a bronze medal. His final game came on April 28, as a member of the Montreal Expos.  On April 10, 1994, while playing for the Arkansas Travelers, he pitched a no-hitter at Shreveport, striking out six and walking two.

Beltrán joined the Cleveland Indians/Guardians organization in 2014, serving as pitching coach for their Triple-A affilitate, the Columbus Clippers, from 2019 to 2022. He was named the Guardians' major league bullpen coach on December 20, 2022.

References

External links

1969 births
Living people
Arkansas Travelers players
Baseball players at the 2003 Pan American Games
Baseball players from Baja California
Brewster Whitecaps players
Colorado Rockies players
Colorado Springs Sky Sox players
Edmonton Trappers players
Hamilton Redbirds players
Hiroshima Toyo Carp players
Louisville Redbirds players
Major League Baseball pitchers
Major League Baseball players from Mexico
Mexican expatriate baseball players in Canada
Mexican expatriate baseball players in Japan
Mexican expatriate baseball players in the United States
Mexican League baseball pitchers
Montreal Expos players
New York Mets players
Nippon Professional Baseball pitchers
Norfolk Tides players
Ottawa Lynx players
Pan American Games bronze medalists for Mexico
Pan American Games medalists in baseball
Saraperos de Saltillo players
Savannah Cardinals players
Scranton/Wilkes-Barre Red Barons players
Sportspeople from Tijuana
St. Louis Cardinals players
St. Petersburg Cardinals players
Tomateros de Culiacán players
Wyoming Cowboys baseball players
Medalists at the 2003 Pan American Games
Point Loma High School alumni